Mountain Page is an unincorporated community in Henderson County, North Carolina, United States. It is in the southeastern edge of the county. The ZIP code is 28773 with a Saluda address even though Saluda is in neighboring Polk County. Mountain Page is named after the locale Page family. The community backs up to the Greenville Watershed in neighboring Greenville County, South Carolina. The community is 12 miles south of Hendersonville, North Carolina the county seat. Mountain Page is a part of the Asheville Metropolitan Area.

External links

Unincorporated communities in Henderson County, North Carolina
Unincorporated communities in North Carolina